William Tandy Senter (May 12, 1801 –  August 28, 1848) was an American politician that represented Tennessee's second district in the United States House of Representatives.

Biography
Senter was born at Bean Station, Tennessee on May 12, 1801. He attended the common schools, and engaged in agricultural pursuits as well as holding several local offices. He married Nancy White.

Career
A minister in the Holston Conference of the Methodist Episcopal Church, South, Senter was also a member of the State constitutional convention, which met at Nashville from May 19 to August 30, 1834.

Senter was elected as a Whig to the Twenty-eighth Congress, and served from March 4, 1843 to March 3, 1845.

After his service, Senter resumed agricultural and ministerial work at Panther Springs, Hamblen County, Tennessee.

Death and legacy
Senter died at Panther Springs on August 28, 1848. He is interred at Senter Memorial Church Cemetery.  The city of Centerville, Iowa was named in his honor, although the spelling was changed because a clerk assumed the proposed name "Senterville" was a misspelling.

References

External links 
 

1801 births
1848 deaths
Whig Party members of the United States House of Representatives from Tennessee
19th-century American politicians
People from Bean Station, Tennessee